The Iowa Thunder was a women's professional American football team based in Des Moines, Iowa. They played in the Women's Spring Football League.  
    
During its first two seasons, the Thunder was a member of the Women's Football Alliance

History
In their Inaugural season, the Thunder became the first team in Iowa history to have a winning record at 5-3 and followed that up in 2010 with a 6-2 campaign that left them tied for 1st in the division (although they lost the tiebreaker to the Minnesota Machine based on head-to-head points total) and the first ever team to garner a playoff berth.  The Thunder defeated the Machine 20–12 in the first round, but lost to the eventual WFA champion Lone Star Mustangs 30–20 in the conference semifinals.

Season-By-Season

|-
| colspan="6" align="center" | Iowa Thunder (WFA)
|-
|2009 || 5 || 3 || 0 || 2nd American Midwest WFA || -- 
|-
|2010 || 6 || 2 || 0 || Tied 1st American Midwest WFA || Won American Conference Quarterfinal (Minnesota)Lost American Conference Semifinal (Lone Star)
|-
| colspan="6" align="center" | Iowa Thunder (WSFL)
|-
|2011 || -- || -- || -- || -- || -- 
|-
!Totals || 12 || 6 || 0
|colspan="2"| (including playoffs)

External links
Iowa Thunder

Sports in Des Moines, Iowa
Women's Spring Football League teams
American football teams in Iowa
American football teams established in 2009
2009 establishments in Iowa
American football teams disestablished in 2011
2011 disestablishments in Iowa
Women's sports in Iowa